Mosquito plant is a common name for several plants and may refer to:

 Azolla species (duckweed ferns)
 Agastache cana (Texas hummingbird mint)
 Pelargonium 'citrosum' (Citrosa geranium, citronella plant)
 Verbena officinalis (Common vervain)